Wonder Pets! is an American educational animated children's television series produced by Little Airplane Productions. The series follows a trio of classroom pets—Linny the Guinea Pig, Tuck Turtle and Ming-Ming Duckling—who use teamwork to help animals in need. Most of the characters' dialogue is sung in the style of operetta. Each episode is set to original music by a 10-member live orchestra.

Josh Selig developed the idea for Wonder Pets! while working on his previous show, Oobi. The series began with two animated shorts called "Linny the Guinea Pig," which acted as a pilot episode. They featured Linny going on adventures set to classical music. Selig first screened the shorts at the wrap party for Oobis first season. The crew of Oobi was impressed with them and urged Selig to pitch them to a TV channel. He eventually decided to send the shorts to Nickelodeon executives. Selig called Nickelodeon "a great partner," saying "They're really the company that first believed in us when we pitched Oobi, and then they believed in us again on Wonder Pets!."

The two original shorts were completed and aired in 2004. The characters of Tuck and Ming-Ming were added to form a team of hero pets for the full-length series. The first long-form episode debuted on March 3, 2006, as part of the Nick Jr. block on Nickelodeon. On March 3, 2006, the series started airing on Nickelodeon's sister channel Noggin. It ran for three seasons and 62 episodes. The final episode aired on March 9, 2016. The first two seasons aired on Nickelodeon, while the majority of season three aired exclusively on the separate Nick Jr. channel.

Overview
Each episode follows a similar structure, with many hallmarks and repeated elements. As each episode begins, children are heard from off-screen, leaving school at the end of the day. They say goodbye to the classroom pets. The classroom is always decorated with student artwork and other items related to a given episode's particular storyline, featured animal, or geographic location. Once the classroom is empty, a pencil holder rattles to create the ringing of a phone.

One by one, the classroom pets notice the ringing phone. As the phone rings, they put on their accessories (a hat for Linny, shoes and a sailor's cap for Tuck, and aviator goggles for Ming-Ming) and make their way towards the phone while singing their opening verses. The Wonder Pets answer the phone and find that an animal is in trouble somewhere. Linny, the Guinea Pig, explains the situation to the other two: Tuck Turtle and Ming-Ming Duckling. They all jump into a box filled with fabric scraps and jump back out wearing different outfits, often alluding to the area of the world they will be visiting. They make a quick joke and jump back into the box, emerging again in superhero capes.

Once dressed, they assemble a flying vehicle called the Flyboat. In some episodes, the Wonder Pets opt for a different mode of transportation by adjusting the Flyboat. Usually, the pets encounter an obstacle before leaving the classroom. The solution is invariably similar to the action they will need to take to save the animal in trouble.

When saving the animal, the Wonder Pets always fail on the first few attempts. The danger escalates, prompting Ming-Ming to sing, "This is sewious!" Suddenly, the Wonder Pets remember how they solved the problem in the classroom and realize that the rescue has a similar solution. They have to work together to achieve the rescue. Once the animal is saved, its parent or other relative appears to give grateful thanks to the Wonder Pets. The pets celebrate with a celery snack. The rescued animal's parent sometimes adds a bit of regional food or insists on a regional preparation. The pets fly back to the classroom and wordlessly return to their cages as their hats and capes come off. The Flyboat automatically disassembles upon landing. Ming-Ming is always the first one to get back in her cage, Tuck is the second, and Linny is the last. A musical riff relating to the episode's rescue is played as Linny takes a bite out of the celery in her cage and winks at the camera. Other pets have winked at the camera including Tuck in Save the Rhino, Ming-Ming in Back to Kalamazoo and In The Land Of Oz and Ollie in Ollie to the Rescue and The Amazing Ollie. Another episode or the end credits then begin.

Episodes

The series debuted on March 3, 2006, on Nickelodeon's Nick Jr. block.

Characters

Main
 Linny (voiced by Sofie Zamchick) is a guinea pig who is the leader of the Wonder Pets and the oldest of the three. As a superhero, she wears an orange hat and a blue cape. Linny is the most educated of the group, often providing information about the different animals and environments that the pets encounter. Linny is usually the one to remind the group about teamwork and offer praise. She has the responsibility of starting and driving the Flyboat. Linny's catchphrase is "This calls for some celery!", said at the end of each adventure. She always carries some celery with her and brings it out to celebrate after every successful mission. 
 Tuck (voiced by Teala Dunn) is a red-eared slider turtle and the second oldest of the Wonder Pets. He is sensitive with an emotional connection to living things and the heart of the group. As a superhero, he wears a white sailor's cap, blue Aquasocks, and a red cape. Tuck is empathetic, often wanting to give the rescued animals a hug or keeping them company while Linny and Ming-Ming put their rescue plan into action. He has keen observational skills and can spot things from long distances, which Linny compliments him, "Good eye, Tuck!" He has an older cousin named Buck, whose cool demeanor and many skills make Tuck jealous.
 Ming-Ming (voiced by Danica Lee) is an overconfident duckling and the youngest of the three. As a superhero, she wears a leather pilot's helmet with goggles and a green cape. Unlike the other Wonder Pets, she can fly and speak "bird," allowing her to connect with other birds that the Wonder Pets encounter. Ming-Ming often provides comic relief in the show and is the Wonder Pet mostly likely to use irony and mild sarcasm. Her family comes from a petting zoo in Kalamazoo, Michigan, and she visits them on occasion. She has a toddler brother named Marvin and her mother's name is Elenora. She speaks with a prominent rhotacism, pronouncing "r" sounds as "w". She is known for saying "This is sewious!" whenever there is trouble. In the episode, "Help the Monster!", when the Baby Monster got their Flyboat, not just Ming-Ming, but all three of them sang, "This is sewious!"

Recurring
 Ollie (voiced by T.J. Stanton and Cooper Corrao) is a gray rabbit who considers himself the fourth Wonder Pet. He is self-centered and often unintentionally annoys the Wonder Pets when he visits their classroom. He has his own superhero team, the "Thunder Pets," consisting of himself and his toys. He is a terrible rescuer and invariably needs help from the Wonder Pets whenever he tries to save something and he lives in a burrow outside of the Wonder Pets' schoolhouse with his mother, sister, and baby brother.
 Ginny (voiced by Anne Meara) is Linny's grandmother. She lives in a nursing home with an old white mouse named Bernie (voiced by Jerry Stiller). Like Linny, she is self-confident, a natural leader, and loves celery.
 The Visitor is an extraterrestrial being who lives on a faraway planet. He resembles a purple frog-like creature with two antennas and one foot. He knows a few English phrases but can only speak in short fragments. He crash-lands on Earth in "Save the Visitor" and needs the Wonder Pets' help to fly back to space. He becomes a good friend of theirs and invites them to his party in "Save the Visitor's Birthday Party".
 Little Bee and Slug are a pair of bug friends. Little Bee is a young bumblebee who is just learning how to make honey for her hive. Slug is a green garden slug who wears the top of an acorn as a hat. Little Bee first appears in "Save the Bee" and "Save the Glowworm". She and Slug appear as the main characters of "The Adventures of Bee & Slug!" and "Bee & Slug Underground!".
 Baby Dragon and Uni are two magical creatures who live in a storybook in the Wonder Pets' classroom. Baby Dragon is a wingless dragon, and Uni is his best friend, a unicorn. They first appear in "Save the Unicorn," in which the Wonder Pets try to help Uni when her horn is stuck in a tree. After freeing Uni, the Wonder Pets try to flee from Baby Dragon, but they discover that he is Uni's best friend. They make a second appearance in "Save the Dragon," in which the Wonder Pets return to the storybook land to save Baby Dragon after he gets stuck on a cloud.
 Baby Chimp is a chimp. He flies a spaceship. He makes his first appearance in "Save the Chimp." His spaceship broke down twice, and then a meteor was coming for him. Then… suddenly, a rainbow appeared.
 Baby Monster is a monster who appears in "Help the Monster." She stomps her toy city down to shreds, and loves monsteroni pizza.

Production and history
Wonder Pets! was created by Josh Selig, the co-founder of Little Airplane Productions. Before Wonder Pets! started, Little Airplane had only produced live-action works, like Oobi and a short film titled The Time-Out Chair. After Oobi became a breakout success for the company, Selig expressed interest in producing another television show. He produced two animated shorts called "Linny the Guinea Pig." At the time, he wanted the cartoon to focus on a silent guinea pig who left her classroom to go on fantastic adventures, each set to classical music. Jennifer Oxley, who had joined Little Airplane as an animator, signed on as the director of the two shorts.

Josh Selig first screened the shorts at the wrap party for Oobis first season. The crew of Oobi was impressed with them and encouraged Selig to pitch them to a television channel. Selig waited until Oobi finished production to start focusing on the shorts. He eventually decided to send the shorts to Nickelodeon executives. Selig called Nickelodeon "a great partner," saying "They're really the company that first believed in us when we pitched Oobi, and then they believed in us again on Wonder Pets!."

Nickelodeon picked up Wonder Pets! for a season of 20 episodes in 2005. Tuck and Ming-Ming were added to the cast to form a team of superhero pets, and the characters were given voices; the dialogue-free nature of the original shorts did not translate well to half-hour episodes. At the time, Selig wanted to call the show The Super Singing Power Pets!, but it was renamed Wonder Pets! because the former name was too long. Selig turned to various former crew members of Oobi to help him develop the show, including writers Chris Nee and Sascha Paladino and composers Larry Hochman and Jeffrey Lesser.

The animation style used to create Wonder Pets! is called "photo-puppetry," and was created for the series to allow animators to manipulate photographs of real animals. It also uses drawn objects (not characters), so the total presentation could be considered animated mixed-media. Jennifer Oxley considers this technique her own invention and first used it to create lifelike transitions for Little Airplane's previous works.

A good deal of the dialog is sung, so the show has been likened to operetta or singspiel. A 10-member live orchestra performs each episode, sometimes including other instrumentalists skilled in music from the region to which the pets are traveling during the episode. Completing each episode took thirty-three weeks from script to final delivery.

DVD compilations

In other media

Books (Wonder Pets! series)
 Arranged in publication date order.

 
 
 
 
 
 
 
 
 
 
 
 
 
 
 
 
 
 
 
 
 
 
 
 
 
 
 
 
 
 
 
 
 
 
 
 
 

Source:

Soundtrack

In addition to the DVDs and books, the show's self-titled track, Wonder Pets!, was released on April 10, 2007. The soundtrack features songs from the show itself, including the main self-titled theme song.

Track listing
All songs are performed by the Wonder Pets unless otherwise noted.

 "The Wonder Pets!"
 "Poor Baby Squirrel"
 "The Caterpillar's Song"
 "Oh, Sheep-eee-hooo!"
 "Tickle the Whale"
 "To Be Free!"
 "Hold On, Pigeon!"
 "Fruit Salad"
 "City Garden Rap"
 "Hug a Hedgy"
 "The Oasis"
 "Hola, Hermit Crab!"
 "Wee-Wee, Pee-Pee, Tinkle!"
 "Brown Cow Down"
 "Wonder Pets, We Love You!"
 "The Wonder Pets! Theme" (Instrumental)

Source:

Game

The show's only game was released on October 27, 2008, in the United States.

Mobile streaming
On July 6, 2016, the first 20 episodes were made available for streaming on the Noggin video service. The remaining episodes will most likely be added to the app in two years. The remaining two seasons(42 episodes) were released on the app on February 7, 2018. All three seasons of the series (62 episodes in total) are also available to buy on Amazon Video. In March 2021, the series was added to Paramount+.

Toys and merchandising
In March 2008, Fisher-Price began distributing a line of official Wonder Pets! toys in the United States. Toys include the Flyboat, figurine playsets, and plush animals. These figurine playsets have each Wonder Pet saving a different baby animal. These include Linny saving a baby penguin, Tuck saving a baby bluebird, and Ming-Ming rescuing a kitten. In addition, there is a whale playset for the tub.

References

External links
 
 Wonder Pets! at the Internet Movie Database
 Wonder Pets! at TV.com
 Wonder Pets! at TV Guide
 Entertainment Weekly interview of creator Josh Selig 
 Gothamist interview of Josh Selig

2000s American animated television series
2010s American animated television series
2000s American children's television series
2010s American children's television series
2000s Nickelodeon original programming
2010s Nickelodeon original programming
2006 American television series debuts
2011 American television series endings
American children's animated adventure television series
American children's animated musical television series
American flash animated television series
American preschool education television series
American television series with live action and animation
Animated preschool education television series
2000s preschool education television series
2010s preschool education television series
English-language television shows
Television shows adapted into video games
Nick Jr. original programming
Nickelodeon original programming
Animated television series about children
Animated television series about ducks
Animated television series about turtles
American television shows featuring puppetry
Television series by Little Airplane Productions